The Menards 250 is a , 250-lap annual ARCA Menards Series race held at Elko Speedway in Elko New Market, Minnesota.

History

ARCA debuted at the track in 2012, running at the track for three consecutive years. After 2014, the race was taken off the calendar for the next two seasons, before being added back for the 2017 season, where it has remained since.

In 2020, the race was cancelled and moved to Toledo due to the COVID-19 pandemic. With this race off the schedule, Menards also moved their title sponsorship to the new Toledo race.

Past winners

Multiple winners (teams)

Manufacturer wins

References

External links
 

ARCA Menards Series races
Annual sporting events in the United States
ARCA Menards Series
Motorsport in Minnesota
NASCAR races at Elko Speedway